The Dhansiri is a river of Golaghat District of Assam and the Chümoukedima District and Dimapur District of Nagaland. It originates from Laisang peak of Nagaland.

While flowing as the boundary between Karbi Anglong and Nagaland, it flanks a large wilderness very rich in wildlife. On one side is the Dhansiri Reserved Forest and on the other Intanki National Park.

It has several types of important wood bearing trees along its bank like Intanki Forest. Dhansari river along with Kapili by headward erosion has completely isolated the Mikir hills from the Peninsular plateau. There are numerous perennially waterlogged swampy region locally known as bils associated with this river.

In Ahom Buranjis, it is mentioned as Khe-Nam-Ti-Ma which means A river coming from watery place. (Khe = A river, Nam = Water, Ti = Place, Ma = Coming)

Fishes
A fish survey conducted in 2011-12 found that the river showed the presence of 34 species of fishes belonging to five orders, thirteen families and 24 genera. Seventeen species of Cypriniformes were found, followed by eight species of Siluriformes. The Dhansiri river in Dimapur has freshwater, semi torrent, hill stream and ornamental fish species.

See also 
 List of rivers of Nagaland

References/Notes

External links
Source Geography of India (Majid Hussain, TMH)
Wetlands along the Dhansiri River channel, Assam - A paper by MK Dutta and P Kotoky
BBC Report:Marching on to Laffan's Plain - Chapter 12 by Alan Shaw
Xobdo.Org Encyclopaedia entry on Dhansiri
Nagaland Pollution Control Board's NWMP entry on water quality levels of the Dhansiri River 

Rivers of Assam
Rivers of Nagaland
Rivers of India